Juniperus grandis, known as Sierra juniper, Sierra western juniper, and western juniper, is a tree or tall shrub that is endemic to the Western United States. It is sometimes considered a variety or subspecies of Juniperus occidentalis, which is also known as western juniper.

Description

The whorled leaves are scale-like and closely appressed. Most plants are dioecious, but about 5–10% are monoecious.

Its pollination period is May and June. The seeds are wingless.

Based on dendrochronological evidence from the 2,675-year-old Scofield Juniper, Sierra junipers are the fourth longest-lived tree species after the Great Basin bristlecone pine, alerce and giant sequoia.

Distribution and habitat
Juniperus grandis is native to the Sierra Nevada in eastern California and western Nevada; and the White and Inyo Mountains, San Gabriel and San Bernardino Mountains, and higher elevations of Mojave Desert mountains, in Southern California.

It is found in exposed, dry, rocky slopes, flats, pinyon–juniper woodland, and temperate coniferous forest habitats, including the Sierra Nevada upper montane forest and Sierra Nevada subalpine zone ecoregions.

References

grandis
Flora of California
Flora of Nevada
Endemic flora of the United States
Trees of the Southwestern United States
Flora without expected TNC conservation status